Daniel Nicolae Djamo is a Romanian visual artist and filmmaker. He finished the courses (BA and MA) of the Time-Based Media department of the Bucharest National University of Arts, from Bucharest. He finished the PhD in Visual Arts at the School for Doctoral Studies, from Bucharest National University of Arts in June 2018.

Winner of the ESSL Art Award CEE (offered by the Essl Museum), Henkel Art.Award. Young artist prize CEE (offered by Museum Moderner Kunst Stiftung Ludwig Wien – mumok and Kulturkontakt Austria), Startpoint Prize Romania (offered by Arbor vitae Foundation, with support from the Ministry of Culture (Czech Republic) and the Grand Prize of the Bucharest National University of Arts.

He exhibited or presented at the Museum of Moscow, Centre for Fine Arts, Brussels (BOZAR), Louvre Museum, Austrian Museum of Folk Life and Folk Art, Arsenale di Venezia, Museum of Contemporary Art, Belgrade, Bank Austria Kunstforum Wien, Oxo Tower, Mori Art Museum, Asia Culture Center and Asia Culture Institute, Historical Museum of Bosnia and Herzegovina, Skulpturenmuseum Glaskasten, Museum of Contemporary Art in Kraków (MOCAK), Bucharest Museum of Contemporary Art and the Essl Museum from Klosterneuburg (Vienna). His video artworks have been screened in numerous video art and film festivals.

Feature film 
Djamo finished in 2014 a documentary about the woman who helped his mother raise him, entitled "A last year in 114 minutes". The movie had its premiere in June 2014, at Transilvania International Film Festival, in Cluj (Romania).

Solo exhibitions 

 2018 "The Good, the Bad and the Ugly" (October – April 2019), Le Shadok: Fabrique du Numérique, Strasbourg, France, curators: Marine Froeliger & Michel Jacquet
 2018 "16 Sounds of Dadaocheng" (October – November), URS127 – Art Factory, Taipei, Taiwan, curators: Hsun-Chen Lin & Yi-Kai Kao; with support from Jing-Liang Jung and Melody Ho
 2018 "Past futures" (February – April), Likovni Salon Gallery – Celje Center for Contemporary Art, Celje, Slovenia, curator: Maja Hodošček
 2018 "Happy Dystopia #4" (January – February), NRVK – Neuer Ravensburger Kunstverein, Ravensburg, Germany, curator: Robert Huber; opening speech: Christian von der Heydt (Director of Wirtschafts Museum Ravensburg – Ravensburg Museum of Economy); with support from Ricarda Patiantosch
 2017 "rise of nations" (August – September), Künstlerhaus Dortmund, Dortmund, Germany, curator: Tanita Groß
 2017 "Sixteen routes to the perfect sunshine" (January – February), Galerija K18, Maribor, Slovenia, curator: Simon Žlahtič
 2016 "Magic… you want?" (October – November), AAI – Afro-Asiatisches Institut Graz, Graz, Austria, curator: Astrid Kury
 2016 "Bjergtrolde" land art project (developed: May – June, permanently on view until the eventual deterioration), supported by Prof. Christel Stalpaert and Jan Hermans (presented alongside Sarah Foque's project from De Wattenfabriek), ARPIA – art with landscape, Herzele, Belgium (special thanks: European Agricultural Fund for Rural Development, Provincie Oost-Vlaanderen / East Flanders Province, the city of Herzele, KASK – Royal Academy of Fine Arts Ghent & Ghent University; project planned between 2015 and 2016)
 2015 "before the end" (March – April), KKW (KunstKraftWerk Leipzig), Leipzig, Germany, curator: Tatevik Sahakyan (with support from The Romanian Cultural Institute)
 2015 "Unicorn tales" (January – February), Victoria Art Gallery – Center for Contemporary Cultural Production, Bucharest, Romania, curator: Daria Ghiu
 2015 "The origin of the florist" (June – July), The Stage (WOLO & Wei-Ling Gallery), Kuala Lumpur, Malaysia, curator: Tatevik Sahakyan
 2015 "Who's afraid of Blue, Yellow and Red?" (July – September), Anca Poterașu Gallery, Bucharest, Romania, curator: Ioana Mandeal
 2015 "Unsichtbare Skulpturen" (October – December), Schloss Plüschow, Plüschow, Germany, curator: Tatevik Sahakyan
 2014 "items" (February – May), Anca Poterașu Gallery, Bucharest, Romania – "items", curator: Anca Poterasu
 2014 "before the end" (November – December), The Briggait, Glasgow, UK, curator: Tatevik Sahakyan
 2014 "A family matter" (November), solo show with Anca Poterașu Gallery at Artissima, Turin, Italy, curator: Anca Poterasu
 2014 "Never glue birds to the ground" (September), Schleifmühlgasse 12–14 Gallery, Vienna, Austria, curator: Carmen Bendovski
 2013 "дo Ende" (February – March), Victoria Art Gallery – Center for Contemporary Cultural Production, Bucharest, curator: Petru Lucaci
 2013 "Costs" (June), Victoria Art Gallery – Center for Contemporary Cultural Production, Bucharest, self-curated (my BA degree exhibition)
 2012 "Showroom" (July  – August), Calina Gallery, Timișoara, Romania, curator: Diana Marincu
 2012 "RULAND" (June), TOKONOMA, Kassel, Germany, curator: Daniel Stubenvoll

References

 Djamo at BOZAR, Brussels.
 Djamo screening at Louvre Auditorium, Paris.
 Djamo at Hangar Center, Brussels.
 DATAMI, RESONANCES III.
 Djamo at Le Shadok, Strasbourg.
 Djamo at AAI, Graz.
 Djamo at Kuenstlerhaus Dortmund.
 Djamo at MARE.
 Djamo at Volkskundemuseum.
 Daniel Djamo's PhD presentation.
 A last year in 114 minutes review.
 Henkel Young Artist prize, mumok.
 Amazing Romanians.
 Kultur Kontakt.
 ESSL award nominees night.
 2012 Saint Vincent Biennale.
 Inside Out@Kunsthaus Dresden.
 A time for dreams@Moscow International Biennale for Young Art.
 RULAND@tokonoma.
 Transcending Cultures, ESSL Museum.
 TIFF 2014, the Romanian film competition.
 items@Anca Poterasu Gallery, ARTFORUM.

External links 
 Daniel Djamo official site
 Revista 22 Erwin Kessler article
 A Romanian asks Angela Merkel to change the name of Germany
 Before the end exhibition
 Daniel Nicolae Djamo won young artist's prize cee
 Daniel Djamo All Hollow interview.

1987 births
Living people
Romanian film directors
Photographers from Bucharest
Place of birth missing (living people)
Bucharest National University of Arts alumni